Migeum (Seoul National University Bundang Hospital) Station is a subway station located in Geumgok-dong. It is between Jeongja Station and Ori Station on the Bundang Line. It became a transfer station to the Shinbundang Line in April 2018.

There was a debate between Seongnam City and Suwon City regarding whether Migeum should be included in the Phase 2 extension of Shinbundang Line. Supporters argued that the distance between Jeongja Station and Dongcheon Station would be unusually long at 3.76 km. They also argued that the inclusion of Migeum will alleviate traffic in the area. On the other hand, opposition in Suwon claims that the inclusion would delay travel time to Gwanggyo, a planned area of Suwon in construction. 

One of the largest commercial districts in Bundang, Migeum has a variety of boutiques, Korean and Western restaurants, chicken-and-beer restaurants, karaoke places, Korean-style barbecues, hagwons, and a 2001 Outlet department store. The Tancheon stream is close by.

References

Bundang
Seoul Metropolitan Subway stations
Metro stations in Seongnam
Railway stations opened in 1994